Culey is a commune in the Meuse department in Grand Est in north-eastern France. Between 1973 and 2014 it was part of the commune of Loisey-Culey.

See also
Communes of the Meuse department

References

Communes of Meuse (department)